"Juligen", also known as Nu är det juligen, is a hip hop Christmas song from 1991 by Just D, both released as a CD and vinyl single.

The song is a Christmas parody, and was released as a single in December 1991, peaking at second position at the Swedish singles chart. "Juligen" also stayed at Svensktoppen for three weeks during the period 15 December 1991-5 January 1992, with an 8th and 10th position.

According to STIM the song received second most radio airplay among Christmas songs of the 2000s in Sweden up to 2010.

Charts

References

1991 songs
1991 singles
Swedish Christmas songs
Swedish-language songs